Luca Spirito (born 30 October 1993) is an Italian volleyball player for Bunge Ravenna and the Italian national team.

He participated at the 2017 Men's European Volleyball Championship.

References

External links
 

1993 births
Living people
Italian men's volleyball players
People from Savona
Volleyball players at the 2015 European Games
European Games competitors for Italy
Competitors at the 2018 Mediterranean Games
Mediterranean Games gold medalists for Italy
Mediterranean Games medalists in volleyball
Sportspeople from the Province of Savona